"Meddle" is a song by English singer and songwriter Little Boots from her debut extended play (EP), Arecibo (2008), and later appearing on her debut studio album, Hands (2009). Written by Little Boots and Joe Goddard, the song was released as a limited-edition promotional single in the United Kingdom on 4 August 2008.

It would later be used in 2011 Kinect game Dance Central 2, and would appear in the British Comedy Show Friday Night Dinner

Critical reception
"Meddle" received generally positive reviews from music critics. In a review for musicOMH, John Murphy called the song "squealy electro goodness" that had "a terrific bit near the end where the backing vocals seem to turn into Gregorian chants before kicking back into the disco beat." Neil Queen of The Times described it as a "barnstormer" that comes "across like a brain-stabbing disco/drum and bass hybrid."

Track listings
UK promotional CD single
(4Bones; released )
"Meddle" – 3:16

UK limited-edition promotional 7" single
(4Bones; released )
A. "Meddle" – 3:16
B. "Meddle" (Toddla T & Ross Orton Remix) – 3:23

Danish promotional CD single – remixes
(Atlantic Records; released 2009)
"Meddle" – 3:15
"Meddle" (Treasure Fingers Remix) – 5:41
"Meddle" (Toddla T and Ross Orton Remix) – 3:28
"Meddle" (Tenorion Piano Version) – 3:12

Other versions
 "Meddle" (Baron von Luxxury Technicolor Remix)
 "Meddle" (Ebola Remix)
 "Meddle" (Joker Remix)

Charts

References

2008 songs
Little Boots songs
Song recordings produced by Greg Kurstin
Songs written by Greg Kurstin
Songs written by Little Boots